Patrick Müller (born 4 February 1996) is a German male shot putter who won two individual gold medal at the Youth World Championships.

References

External links

1996 births
Living people
German male shot putters
21st-century German people